Rehearsal for Murder is an American murder mystery television film  starring Robert Preston and Lynn Redgrave, and directed by David Greene. The script, written by Richard Levinson and William Link, won a 1983 Edgar Award from the Mystery Writers of America. It originally aired on the CBS Television Network on May 26, 1982.

Plot
(Television Film)

When his leading lady (and fiancée) Monica Welles (Redgrave) is found dead from an apparent suicide after the opening night of her Broadway stage debut, playwright Alex Dennison (Preston) is left heartbroken. On the first anniversary of her death, he gathers the cast and crew from that ill-fated night in the same Broadway theater, ostensibly to read a new play he is working on, a mystery in which a famous actress is killed. As the reading progresses, the scenes seem to the cast to be uncomfortably close to actual encounters they might have had with Monica. When pressed, Alex finally reveals that he believes that Monica was murdered and that someone at the theater is her killer.

(Theatrical Production)

One year after the supposed suicide of his fiancée (Monica Welles) Alex Dennison invites his friends, some cast and crew from the play one year ago, to read through a new play, Killing Jessica. Along with the cast he invites another actor (Frank Heller) to pose as a police officer(Henry McElroy). During the reading of the scenes, some of the cast become unnerved by Jessica's similarity to the late Monica Welles and the scenes' similarity to reality. After reading a few scenes, the producer (Bella Lamb), director (Lloyd Andrews) and lead (David Matthews) demand to know what is Alex's true intentions are, leading him to reveal that the killer of Monica is in the theatre. Most of the cast and crew decides on leaving, but with aid of the false police officer and the unintentional aid of the producer (Bella Lamb), they are convinced of reading through more scenes. After reading the a few more scenes, they start to question Alex's mental state, leading to them to leave for the sake of Alex's mental health. However, Alex draws a revolver on his friends, forcing them to stay and keep reading through his scenes. After Alex is convinced that the comic (Leo Gibbs) killed Monica, he draws his revolver once more and fires upon Leo with blank cartridges. The lights go out after someone conspiring with Alex pulls the switch. The chaos leads to Frank Heller revealing what he knows about Monica's apartment the day she died. Alex his friends reveal that they knew that he was the killer all along, and all they wanted out of him was a confession. Frank reveals that Monica nearly slept with him after a fight with Alex, and so he used that as blackmail to get a large sum of money from Monica. After the meeting went wrong, he unintentionally killed Monica. The real Henry McElroy reveals that he was watching the whole time and comes to arrest Frank. Alex and his friends rejoice that the killer has been brought to justice after all this time. The play ends after his friends leave and Alex toasts with Monica's untouched glass; showing him making peace with this new reality.

Cast
 Robert Preston as Alex Dennison
 Lynn Redgrave as Monica Welles
 Patrick Macnee as David Matthews
 Lawrence Pressman as Lloyd Andrews
 William Russ as Frank Heller
 Madolyn Smith as Karen Daniels
 Jeff Goldblum as Leo Gibbs
 William Daniels as Walter Lamb
 John Finnegan as Damon
 Vahan Moosekian as The Moving Man
 Nicholas Mele as First Officer
 Charlie Robinson as Second Officer
 Sergio Kato as Third Officer
 Wallace Rooney as Ernie
 Buck Young as Lieutenant McElroy

External links

Edgar Award-winning works
Films directed by David Greene
Films scored by Billy Goldenberg
1982 television films
1982 films
1980s mystery thriller films
American mystery thriller films
American thriller television films
1980s English-language films
1980s American films